Raffaele Masto (12 December 1953 – 28 March 2020) was an Italian journalist, writer and radio host.

Biography 

Masto was born in Milan in 1953. From 1989, he worked as journalist at the foreign news office of Radio Popolare. He was sent to Middle East, Latin America and especially to Africa, the continent where he found the inspiration for many of his essays, mainly published by Sperling & Kupfer and by Baldini & Castoldi. Also in Africa he made several documentaries and reportages on political, social and anthropological themes.

For many years he wrote for the magazine Africa, for which he edited the in-depth analysis blog Buongiorno Africa ("Good morning, Africa").

In his books, always based on direct experience as a foreign correspondent, Masto dealt with the themes of poverty and injustice that affect the peoples of the Third World. During his travels, he was repeatedly a guest at the centers of the Milanese NGO Amani in Nairobi.

In 2019, he married his longtime partner Gisele Kra, from the Ivory Coast. In late 2019, Masto was hospitalized in Bergamo where he underwent a successful heart transplant; while recovering in hospital, in February 2020, he was infected by SARS-Cov-2 during the COVID-19 pandemic in Italy, leading to his death in Bergamo on 28 March 2020, at age 66.

Books 

 1998 – La nuova colonizzazione , Baldini& Castoldi Dalai
 2000 – Debito da morire, Baldini& Castoldi Dalai
 2001 – No Global, Zelig Editrice
 2002 – Informazione negata, Zelig Editrice
 2003 – In Africa. Ritratto di un continente senza pace, Sperling & Kupfer
 2005 – Io Safiya, Sperling & Kupfer
 2006 – L'Africa del tesoro. Diamanti, oro, petrolio, Sperling & Kupfer
 2008 – La scelta di Said. Storia di un kamikaze, Sperling & Kupfer
 2011 – Buongiorno Africa, Bruno Mondadori
 2016 – Califfato Nero, Laterza
 2019 – La variabile africana. Riserve naturali ed equilibrio geopolitico del pianeta, Egea

References

External links 
 Buongiorno Africa 

Italian male journalists
Italian male writers
Italian bloggers
Male bloggers
Italian radio presenters
1953 births
2020 deaths
Deaths from the COVID-19 pandemic in Lombardy
Writers from Milan